"There for You" is a song by Dutch DJ Martin Garrix and Australian singer-songwriter Troye Sivan. It was released on 26 May 2017. The remixes album was released on 18 August 2017, featuring remixes from Araatan, Bali Bandits, Bart B More, Julian Jordan, Madison Mars, Vintage Culture, King Arthur, Goldhouse, Brohug, Lione and Lontalius.

Background 
Garrix debuted the song with Troye Sivan, who joined him on stage to perform at the Coachella Valley Music And Arts Festival of Empire Polo Club in Indio, California on 14 April 2017. Sivan announced the title on Twitter and indicated that the song would have an official release, by saying "I love you guys and can't wait for you to have this song in ur phones". Garrix announced that "There for You" would be officially available on 26 May via an Instagram post. He revealed the artwork for the song in a post on Twitter.

Track listing

Credits and personnel 
Credits adapted from Tidal.

 Martin Garrix – composing, producing, engineering
 Troye Sivan – composing
 Brett McLaughlin – composing, engineering
 Ben Burgess – composing
 William Lobban Bean – composing
 Jessie Thomas – composing
 Cook Classics – producing
 Bart Schoudel – producing, engineering
 Chelsea Avery – engineering

Charts

Weekly charts

Year-end charts

Certifications

References 

Songs written by Martin Garrix
Martin Garrix songs
Electronic songs
Troye Sivan songs
2017 songs
Songs written by Leland (musician)
Songs written by Troye Sivan
Stmpd Rcrds singles
Songs written by Cook Classics